Aurelian Springs is an unincorporated community in Halifax County, North Carolina, United States. It is part of the Roanoke Rapids, North Carolina Micropolitan Statistical Area.

The Edmunds-Heptinstall House was listed on the National Register of Historic Places in 1979.

References

Unincorporated communities in Halifax County, North Carolina
Unincorporated communities in North Carolina
Roanoke Rapids, North Carolina micropolitan area